Melanoplus rileyanus, known generally as the Riley's short-wing grasshopper or Riley's spur-throat grasshopper, is a species of spur-throated grasshopper in the family Acrididae. It is found in North America.

Subspecies
These two subspecies belong to the species Melanoplus rileyanus:
 Melanoplus rileyanus rileyanus Scudder, 1897 i c g
 Melanoplus rileyanus varicus Scudder, 1879 i c g
Data sources: i = ITIS, c = Catalogue of Life, g = GBIF, b = Bugguide.net

References

Melanoplinae
Articles created by Qbugbot
Insects described in 1897